Light Fantastic may refer to:

Film and TV
 Light Fantastic (TV series), a BBC Four documentary television series about the history and discovery of light
 "The Light Fantastic", an episode of ABC Stage 67
 "The Light Fantastic", an episode of Pokémon

Other
 The Light Fantastic, a satirical fantasy novel by Terry Pratchett
 The Light Fantastic, a Star Trek novel
 Light Fantastic (album), a 1999 album by Steve Roach

See also 
 Trip the light fantastic (disambiguation)